Reid Fragel (born February 22, 1991) is a former American football offensive tackle. He played college football at Ohio State and was drafted by the Cincinnati Bengals in the seventh round of the 2013 NFL Draft.

Professional career

Cincinnati Bengals
Fragel was drafted by the Cincinnati Bengals in the seventh round of the 2013 NFL Draft. On August 31, 2013, he was waived by the Bengals. On the following day, he cleared waivers and was signed to the Bengals' practice squad.

Cleveland Browns
On October 29, 2013, the Cleveland Browns signed Fragel from the Bengals' practice squad. On August 30, 2014, he was waived by the Browns.

Atlanta Falcons
On September 23, 2014, Fragel was signed to the Atlanta Falcons' practice squad. He was waived by the Falcons on May 1, 2015.

Tampa Bay Buccaneers
Fragel was claimed off waivers on May 4, 2015. On September 6, 2015, he was released by the Buccaneers. On September 8, 2015, he was signed to the Buccaneers' practice squad. On September 30, 2015, he was promoted to the Buccaneers' active roster. On October 3, 2015, Fragel was waived by the Buccaneers. On October 6, 2015, he was signed to the Buccaneers' practice squad.

Kansas City Chiefs 
On December 2, 2015, the Kansas City Chiefs signed Fragel to the practice squad.

On January 3, 2016, the Chiefs released Fragel from the practice squad. On September 3, 2016, he was released by the Chiefs.

Minnesota Vikings
On January 3, 2017, Fragel signed a reserve/future contract with the Minnesota Vikings. He was released by the Vikings on September 2, 2017.

References

External links
Tampa Bay Buccaneers bio

1991 births
Living people
American football offensive tackles
Ohio State Buckeyes football players
People from Grosse Pointe, Michigan
Players of American football from Michigan
Cincinnati Bengals players
Cleveland Browns players
Atlanta Falcons players
Tampa Bay Buccaneers players
Kansas City Chiefs players
Minnesota Vikings players